Coombes is an English surname. Notable people with the surname include:

 Charly Coombes (born 1980), American-born, English multi-instrumentalist and vocalist
 Gaz Coombes (born 1976), English musician and singer-songwriter (Supergrass)
 Geoff Coombes (1919–2002), English-born, US international footballer (soccer) 
 James Coombes (disambiguation)
 Peet Coombes (1952–1997), British musician, guitarist and vocalist
 Richard Coombes (1858–1935), English-born journalist and 'father' of amateur athletics in Australia
 Rob Coombes (born 1972), English musician (Supergrass)
 Robert Coombes (rower) (1808–1860), English oarsman and world champion sculler
 Rod Coombes (born 1946), English singer-songwriter and musician
 William Henry Coombes (1767–1850), English Catholic priest, theologian and writer
B. L. Coombes (1893–1974), English author and coal miner

See also
Coombes, village in Sussex, England
Coombs (disambiguation)
Coombe (disambiguation)
Combes (disambiguation)

English-language surnames